William Washburn (1808–1890) was an architect and city councilor in Boston, Massachusetts, USA, in the mid-19th century. He designed Boston's National Theatre (1836), Revere House hotel (1847), Tremont Temple (1853) and Parker House hotel (1854). He served on the Boston Common Council from ward 6 in 1854 and 1855. He was chairman of the Boston Board of Aldermen in 1855.

Designed by Washburn
 Renovation of Old State House, Boston (with Isaiah Rogers, 1830)
 Grace Church, Temple Street, Boston (c. 1835)
 National Theatre, West End, Boston (1836)
 Revere House hotel, Boston (1847)
 American House, Hanover St., Boston (rebuilt 1851)
 Tremont Temple, Tremont St., Boston (1853)
 Remodelling of interior of Massachusetts State House (1853)
 Parker House hotel, School St., Boston (1854)
 Fifth Avenue Hotel, New York (1859)
 Victoria Hotel, New York
 Charlestown City Hall, Massachusetts
 Young's Hotel, Boston (1860)
 Adams House, Washington St., Boston

Image gallery
Buildings designed by Washburn

References

1808 births
1890 deaths
Architects from Boston
19th century in Boston
Boston City Council members
19th-century American architects
19th-century American politicians